Pavlo Valentynovych Shostka (born 24 June 2002) is a Ukrainian professional footballer who plays  as a defender for Ukrainian Second League club Dnipro Cherkasy.

Club career
Shostka is a product of the youth academy of Desna Chernihiv. He played for Desna 3 Chernihiv, the system's under-19 squad, for whom he played 20 matches and scored one goal. In the 2020–21 season, he played for Desna 2 Chernihiv, the system's under-21 squad, for whom he played 16 matches.

Dnipro Cherkasy
In October 2021, he moved to FC Dnipro Cherkasy in the Ukrainian Second League. On 18 October he made his debut and scored his first goal for the club against Rubikon Kyiv.

Rubikon Kyiv
In summer 2022, he moved to Rubikon Kyiv in Ukrainian Second League.

References

External links
 on Official website of Ukrainian Premier League
 Profile on Official website of Ukrainian Second League
 
 

2002 births
Living people
Footballers from Chernihiv
Ukrainian footballers
Association football defenders
SDYuShOR Desna players
FC Desna-3 Chernihiv players
FC Desna-2 Chernihiv players
FC Dnipro Cherkasy players
FC Rubikon Kyiv players
Ukrainian Second League players